Bruce Dickinson is a heavy metal singer, whose career has spanned more than three decades. In early 1989, during his first tenure in Iron Maiden, Zomba asked Dickinson to contribute a track for the film A Nightmare on Elm Street 5: The Dream Child, providing a budget, a studio, and a producer, Chris Tsangarides. Dickinson took up the opportunity and called an old friend of his, former Gillan guitarist Janick Gers. Shortly after meeting, they had "Bring Your Daughter to the Slaughter" ready for the studio, which was recorded with the assistance of bassist Andy Carr and drummer Fabio del Rio. Impressed with the results, Zomba convinced Dickinson to record a full album using the same line-up, leading to 1990's Tattooed Millionaire. A supporting tour followed, for which an unavailable Del Rio was replaced by drummer Dickie Fliszar.

To concentrate on his second solo effort, Balls to Picasso, Dickinson left Iron Maiden in 1993 and collaborated with American producer, Keith Olsen. Two attempts at recording the album were made with Olsen as producer, using drummer Dickie Fliszar and guitarist Myke Gray of Skin, bassist Jim Crichton of Saga and various session musicians. Unhappy with the results of these sessions, Dickinson began working with Tribe of Gypsies guitarist Roy Z and started the record from scratch. Released in 1994, the album was recorded with Tribe of Gypsies as the backing band, which then included Z, bassist Eddie Casillas and drummer Dave Ingraham (percussionist Mario Aguilar and vocalist Dean Ortega also guested on the song "Shoot All the Clowns"), in addition to percussionist Doug Van Booven, while Fliszar's drum parts from the Olsen sessions were retained for the closing track, "Tears of the Dragon". Due to Tribe of Gypsies unavailability, Dickinson had to put a new band together for the release's supporting tour. This group featured guitarist and writer Alex Dickson, bassist Chris Dale and drummer Alessandro Elena. Following the tour, during which the 1995 live album Alive in Studio A was recorded, Dickinson decided to use the band on his third solo release, 1996's Skunkworks. Although Dickinson wanted Skunkworks to be the band's name, the record label (Raw Power) refused to release the album without his name on the cover.

Due to musical differences, the Skunkworks line-up disbanded at the supporting tour's conclusion. After a short period of inactivity, Dickinson once again teamed up with Roy Z to record his next album, 1997's Accident of Birth, which also featured Balls to Picasso contributors and Tribe of Gypsies members Eddie Casillas and Dave Ingraham. Former Iron Maiden guitarist Adrian Smith was asked to guest but remained as a full-time member. The line-up stayed intact for a further studio album, 1998's The Chemical Wedding, before Dickinson and Smith rejoined Iron Maiden in 1999. Although Z was unable to take part in The Chemical Wedding'''s supporting tour (his replacement was guitar technician Richard Carette), he did take part in the 1999 live album, Scream for Me Brazil.

In 2001, the compilation album, The Best of Bruce Dickinson, was released, which featured two new tracks recorded with drummer Dickie Fliszar and Roy Z on all other instruments. In the summer of 2002, while Iron Maiden were taking a break from touring, Dickinson decided to play a series of European festival shows. For these performances, Dickinson formed a band featuring Skunkworks collaborators Alex Dickson and Chris Dale (who had formed their own group, Sack Trick), drummer Robin Guy and guitarist Pete Friesen. For his latest album, 2005's Tyranny of Souls, Dickinson once again teamed up with Roy Z. The composition of the release's songs began in 2003, which largely involved Z sending recordings of riffs to Dickinson while he was on tour with Iron Maiden. For the album's recording, the drums and keyboards were performed respectively by David Moreno and Giuseppe Iampieri (credited as "Maestro Mistheria"), while the bass parts were contributed by Ray Burke, Juan Perez and Roy Z, who also undertook all the guitar work.

 Current members 

Bruce Dickinson
Active: 1989 onwards
Instruments: vocals, tambourines
Release contributions: all Bruce Dickinson releases

Roy Z
Active: 1993–1994, 1996–1999, 2001, 2003 onwards
Instruments: guitars, bass, keyboards
Release contributions: Balls to Picasso (1994), then from Accident of Birth (1997) to present

 Former members 

Janick Gers
Active: 1989–1990
Instruments: guitars
Release contributions: Tattooed Millionaire (1990), Dive! Dive! Live! (1990 live video)

Fabio del Rio
Active: 1989–1990
Instruments: drums
Release contributions: Tattooed Millionaire (1990)

Eddie Casillas
Active: 1993–1994, 1996–1999
Instruments: bass
Release contributions: Balls to Picasso (1994), then from Accident of Birth (1997) to Scream for Me Brazil (1999 live)

Alex Dickson
Active: 1995–1996 
Instruments: guitars
Release contributions: Alive in Studio A (1995 live), Skunkworks (1996)

Alessandro Elena
Active: 1995–1996
Instruments: drums
Release contributions: Alive in Studio A (1995 live), Skunkworks (1996)

Andy Carr
Active: 1989–1990
Instruments: bass
Release contributions: Tattooed Millionaire (1990), Dive! Dive! Live! (1990 live video)

Dickie Fliszar
Active: 1990, 1994, 2001
Instruments: drums
Release contributions: Dive! Dive! Live! (1990 live video), "Tears of the Dragon" (1994 single), "Silver Wings" and "Broken" from The Best of Bruce Dickinson (2001 compilation)

David Ingraham
Active: 1993–1994, 1996–1999
Instruments: drums 
Release contributions: Balls to Picasso (1994), then from Accident of Birth (1997) to Scream for Me Brazil (1999 live)

Chris Dale
Active: 1995–1996 
Instruments: bass
Release contributions: Alive in Studio A (1995 live), Skunkworks (1996)

Adrian Smith
Active: 1996–1999
Instruments: guitars 
Release contributions: From Accident of Birth (1997) to Scream for Me Brazil (1999 live)

 Session musicians 
      

Myke Gray
Active: 1993
Instruments: guitars
Release contributions: Balls to Picasso (2005 reissue bonus tracks)

Doug Van Booven
Active: 1993–1994
Instruments: percussion
Release contributions: Balls to Picasso (1994)

Mario Aguilar
Active: 1993–1994
Instruments: percussion
Release contributions: "Shoot All the Clowns" (1994 single)

Ray Burke
Active: 2005
Instruments: bass
Release contributions: Tyranny of Souls (2005)

David Moreno 
Active: 2005
Instruments: drums
Release contributions: Tyranny of Souls (2005)

Jim Crichton
Active: 1993
Instruments: bass
Release contributions: Balls to Picasso (2005 reissue bonus tracks)

Dean Ortega
Active: 1993–1994
Instruments: backing vocals
Release contributions: "Shoot All the Clowns" (1994 single)

Juan Perez 
Active: 2005
Instruments: bass
Release contributions: Tyranny of Souls (2005)

Giuseppe Iampieri (Credited as "Maestro Mistheria")
Active: 2005
Instruments: keyboards
Release contributions: Tyranny of Souls'' (2005)

Touring musicians

      

Richard Carette
Active: 1998–1999
Instruments: guitars
Release contributions: None

Robin Guy
Active: 2002
Instruments: drums
Release contributions: None

Pete Friesen
Active: 2002
Instruments: guitars
Release contributions: None

Timeline

References 
General

 

Specific

External links 

 

Band members
Dickinson, Bruce